Kazungula is a small border post settlement in Matabeleland North, Zimbabwe close to Botswana, Namibia and Zambia. Just to the west is the Botswana border village of Kazungula, from where there is a bridge for vehicles across the Zambezi River to the town in Zambia also called Kazungula.

Kazungula is linked by a tarred road to Victoria Falls, 70 km east.

References

Populated places in Matabeleland North Province
Botswana–Zimbabwe border crossings